Po Dharma (9 October 1948–22 February 2019) was an activist of Vietnam. He was also a Cham cultural historian.

Po Dharma was a Cham, his birth name is Quảng Văn Đủ. He was born in Chất Thường Village (Cham: Palei Baoh Dana), Ninh Phước District, Ninh Thuận Province. He was one of FULRO leaders during Vietnam War. In December 1970, he was seriously injured on the battlefield of Kampong Cham against the North Vietnamese communist forces. Later, he quit his military career after seeking the permission of Les Kosem, and went to France.

He obtained bachelor's degree in 1978, master degree in 1980, and PhD in 1986. His research was mainly about Champa history and Cham cultures.

Po Dharma and his family were not allowed to return to Vietnam.

Po Dharma died in Toulouse on 22 February 2019.

References

External links
Po Dharma - WorldCat Identities

1948 births
2019 deaths
People from Ninh Thuận province
Vietnamese Cham people
People of the Vietnam War
Vietnamese anti-communists
Vietnamese dissidents
Vietnamese expatriates in France
20th-century French historians
Historians of Vietnam